Rameshwar Tantia (1910-1977) was an Indian politician.  He was elected to the Lok Sabha, the lower house of the Parliament of India from Sikar, Rajasthan as a member of the Indian National Congress.

References

External links
Official biographical sketch in Parliament of India website

India MPs 1957–1962
India MPs 1962–1967
Lok Sabha members from Rajasthan
Indian National Congress politicians
1910 births
1977 deaths